Chunchupalle is a census town in Bhadradri Kothagudem district of the Indian state of Telangana. It is located in Chunchupalli mandal of Kothagudem revenue division.

Demographics
 India census, Chunchupalle had a population of 18,967. Males constitute 50% of the population and females 50%. Chunchupalle has an average literacy rate of 70%, higher than the national average of 59.5%: male literacy is 76% and, female literacy is 63%. In Chunchupalle, 11% of the population is under 6 years of age.

References

Mandals in Bhadradri Kothagudem district
Cities and towns in Bhadradri Kothagudem district